Geoffrey Becker (born 1959) is an American short story writer, and novelist.

Life
He teaches at Towson University.  Graduated from Colby College in 1980.

His work appeared in Antioch Review, Colorado Review, Crazyhorse, Crescent Review, failbetter.com, Florida Review, Gettysburg Review, Kansas Quarterly, North American Review, Ploughshares, Prairie Schooner, Quarterly West, Roanoke Review, Sonora Review, The Cincinnati Review, West Branch.

He lives in Baltimore, Maryland.

Awards
 1995 Drue Heinz Literature Prize for Dangerous Men
 Nelson Algren Award, for Bluestown
 NEA fellowship,

Works

Short stories

Novels

Anthologies
 
 The Best American Short Stories (Houghton Mifflin, 2000) “Black Elvis”

References

1959 births
Living people
American short story writers
Colby College alumni
Towson University faculty
American male short story writers